Lustre is the fifth studio album from British singer-songwriter Ed Harcourt. The album was released on 14 June 2010 in the UK, and a day later in the US. The album is the first release on Harcourt's own label Piano Wolf Recordings, distributed through Essential Music Marketing (in North America, the album was released through Nice Music Group). The album follows his 2009 EP Russian Roulette, and is his first studio album since 2006's The Beautiful Lie. On his official MySpace blog, Harcourt said of the album: "It's got horns, violins, howling, mellophones, the Langley sisters, barks, whistles, hell I even sung down by a creek in the middle of the night." Harcourt told Direct Current that the album is "about that gleaming quality – the vitality, the passion – that drives you to keep going and not give up." A special edition of the album was also released in the UK, featuring a bonus disc of unreleased recordings. The album was preceded by the radio single "Do as I Say Not as I Do."

Lustre reached number 12 on the UK Indie Album Chart upon its release.

Critical reception

Geeks.co.uk awarded the album 5 out of 5 stars, and called the album "an open, honest and beautifully reflective album." Allmusic gave the album 4.5 out of 5 stars, saying the album is "a sweepingly romantic, epic, and sparkling collection of tunes that finds the British singer/songwriter ruminating on true love, money issues, and parenthood in a way that only a man who has found his place in the world can," and concluding that "Lustre takes on a kind of cinematic joy where Harcourt the long-suffering vampiric troubadour steps into the light and shines."

Track listing

Personnel
Musicians
 Ed Harcourt – vocals, guitar, piano, organ, Hammond organ, synthesizer, glockenspiel, mellotron, Wurlitzer, sampling
 Gita Harcourt – violin, backing vocals, handclaps
 Edie Langley – backing vocals, handclaps
 Rosie Langley – backing vocals, handclaps
 Ashley Dzerigian – bass, double bass
 Raife Burchell – drums
 Joe Hadlock – accordion
 Matt Bricker – trumpet
 Kimo Muraki – baritone saxophone, tenor saxophone, mellophone

Production
 Produced by Ryan Hadlock and Ed Harcourt
 Recorded and mixed by Ryan Hadlock
 Assistant engineers: Amanda Barron, Matt Doctor, Reuben Cohen, and Trevor Spencer
 Mastered by Gavin Lurssen
 Photography by Steve Gullick
 Design and illustrations by Nikki Pinder
 Layout and assistant art direction by George Awad

References

2010 albums
Ed Harcourt albums
Albums recorded at Bear Creek Studio